Jászdózsa is a village on the banks of the Tarna river in the Jász region of Jász-Nagykun-Szolnok county in central Hungary approximately  east of Budapest. 

The village is on the Vámosgyörk–Újszász–Szolnok railway line.

History
Its name first appears in documents dating back to 1344.

Tourist sights
 Roman Catholic church on the main square, built in 1777 and reconstructed in 1872.
 Small local museum.

External links
 Official site in Hungarian
 Map of Jászdózsa

Populated places in Jász-Nagykun-Szolnok County
Jászság